Helprich Haico Stephanus Adrianus Scharn (18 June 1945 – 10 June 2021) was a Dutch middle-distance runner. He competed at Helsinki's 1971 European Athletics Championships in the 1500 m, in which he reached the eighth place in the final. He competed at the 1972 Summer Olympics, again in the 1500 m, advancing to the semi-finals. He finished in fourth place in this event at the 1974 European Athletics Championships in Rome.

After retiring from running he worked as athletics coach, training such competitors as Els Vader, Letitia Vriesde, Stella Jongmans, Yvonne van der Kolk and Leon Haan.

References

1945 births
2021 deaths
Athletes (track and field) at the 1972 Summer Olympics
Dutch male middle-distance runners
Olympic athletes of the Netherlands
People from Gemert-Bakel
Dutch athletics coaches
Sportspeople from North Brabant
20th-century Dutch people